El adorable profesor Aldao is a Peruvian Telenovela produced by Vlado Radovich for Panamericana Televisión in 1970

Cast
 Regina Alcóver ...Viviana Hortiguera
 Julio Alemán ...Mariano Aldao
 Patricia Aspíllaga ....Constanza
 Hernan Romero 
 Elvira Tizon ...Delmira
 Nora Guzmán ... Madre superiora 
 Esmeralda checa ... Peralta
 Yola Polastri
 Liz Ureta
 Gabriela Linares
 Francisco Solari
 Irene de Zela
 Miriran Gonzáles
 Carmen Stain
 Maria del Carmen Ureta

References

External links 

Peruvian telenovelas
1970 telenovelas
Spanish-language telenovelas
Panamericana Televisión telenovelas